For the Selwyn Range in the Canadian Rockies, see: Selwyn Range (Canada).  Note also the Selwyn Mountains on the border between the Yukon and Northwest Territories in Canada.

The Selwyn Range (also known as the Isa Highlands) is a rugged mountain range near Mount Isa and Cloncurry in north-west Queensland, Australia, composed largely of Proterozoic metamorphic rocks.  It is drained in the north by the Williams and Fullarton rivers, which run into the Gulf of Carpentaria, and in the south by the McKinlay River and its tributary, Boorama Creek which drain also into the Gulf of Carpentaria.  The area is heavily mineralised, containing copper, gold, lead, and zinc, and is important for mining.

The Kalkadoon people are the traditional owners of the land. Kalkatunga (also known as Kalkadoon, Kalkadunga, Kalkatungu) is an Australian Aboriginal language. The Kalkatunga language region is North-West Queensland including the local government areas of the City of Mount Isa.

The climate of the Selwyn Range is tropical, monsoonal and semi-arid, with an erratic, mainly summer, annual rainfall of 380 mm.  Vegetation cover is low eucalypt woodland and spinifex grassland.

Notes

References
 Jones, M.R. (2004). Alluvial landscapes of the Maronan area, Cloncurry - McKinlay District, Queensland.  CRC LEME Open File Report 129 (abstract)
 Robertson, I.D.M.; & Li Shu. (2003). Eloise Cu-Au deposit, Cloncurry District, Queensland. CRC LEME.
 State of the Environment Queensland 1999 – Inland Waters

Mountain ranges of Queensland
North West Queensland
Shire of Cloncurry